Seneca Creek may refer to:

 Seneca Creek (Potomac River), Maryland
 Seneca Creek State Park
 Seneca Creek, a watercourse in New Mexico and Oklahoma
 Seneca Creek (North Fork South Branch Potomac River), West Virginia
 Seneca Creek Ltd. --an outdoor media journal